Yoldani Silva is a Paralympian athlete from Venezuela competing mainly in category T12 sprint events.

Yoldani competed in the T12 100m at the 2008 Summer Paralympics in Beijing, he also went on to win a silver medal with his Venezuelan teammates in the T11-13 4 × 100 m behind host nation China.

External links
 profile on paralympic.org

Paralympic athletes of Venezuela
Athletes (track and field) at the 2008 Summer Paralympics
Paralympic silver medalists for Venezuela
Venezuelan male sprinters
Living people
Year of birth missing (living people)
Place of birth missing (living people)
Medalists at the 2008 Summer Paralympics
Paralympic medalists in athletics (track and field)
Medalists at the 2011 Parapan American Games
20th-century Venezuelan people
21st-century Venezuelan people